Chronicles of Chaos (shortened as CoC) was an extreme metal webzine. It focused on artists that are generally outside the metal mainstream, and occasionally covers other forms of extreme music as well. Online since August 1995, Chronicles of Chaos was one of the first webzines in the world for that genre of music. It has been a nonprofit publication since its inception. Chronicles of Chaos stopped publishing new articles in August 2015.

History
Chronicles of Chaos was founded by Canadians Gino Filicetti and Adrian Bromley in 1995, and started out in the shape of a monthly e-mail digest.

In its early years, CoC was one of the few to publish reviews and interviews on the Internet featuring bands such as Eyehategod, Nevermore, Strapping Young Lad and Dimmu Borgir before they were well known, as well as numerous other bands that were popular in the mid-1990s metal underground, including At the Gates, Fear Factory, Dismember, Dissection, Brutal Truth, Napalm Death, Sepultura, Hypocrisy, My Dying Bride, Type O Negative, Cannibal Corpse, Edge of Sanity, Paradise Lost, Amorphis, Morbid Angel, In Flames, Sentenced, Therion, Emperor, Vader, Grimlord, Bolt Thrower, Opeth and Slayer, among others. CoC also interviewed the leaders of labels such as Earache Records, Peaceville and The End Records.

1995–2002
Initially composed of four contributors from Canada and the USA in 1995, the staff eventually reached a stable set of nine writers in 1997, including the first European contributor. Near the year 2000, the European contingent was expanded by three new writers, with representatives from the Asian and African continents joining shortly after. This led to a core staff of twelve writers in 2002.

In this period, founder Filicetti retired from his role as contributor, while co-founder Bromley moved on to form his own print publication, Unrestrained!, with fellow CoC contributor Adam Wasylyk. Meanwhile, various other writers departed or became part-time contributors due to other engagements. Some of Chronicles of Chaos''' writing staff became contributors to magazines like Metal Hammer, Terrorizer, Unrestrained! and more. As a result, the e-mail issues became less regular, with as much as three month gaps.

Between October 2002 and March 2003 the publication went on an unofficial hiatus for the only time in its history. Until 2003, the Chronicles of Chaos website served only as a static repository of plain text back issues, with the latest digest available for hypertext navigation.

2003–2015
From 2003 onwards, the publication adopted a database-driven website. Older articles previously found only inside plain text files became immediately accessible, and the new system also allowed articles to be published more frequently and directly to the website. The e-mail digest returned to its original monthly schedule, gathering up the articles published on the website during that month. More than 100 issues of the e-mail digest were published until 2011, containing over 20 megabytes of text.

The staff was gradually augmented between 2003 and 2008 with the addition of new European, American and Australian writers. This led to a total of around twenty writers, although several of those were only sporadic part-time contributors who were previously an integral part of the publication pre-2003. In keeping with its international tradition, over a dozen different nationalities were represented in the staff.

In 2007, Chronicles of Chaos was mentioned by sociologist Keith Kahn-Harris in his book on extreme metal.

On December 7, 2008, Chronicles of Chaos co-founder Adrian Bromley died due to pneumonia, in his sleep, aged 37. His passing prompted numerous tributes within the music industry.

2015–present
On August 12, 2015, marking the twentieth anniversary of the magazine, founder Gino Filicetti and co-editor Pedro Azevedo announced that Chronicles of Chaos had ceased publication of new articles. The reasons for this decision included much increased public access to streaming and downloading albums, as well as a dearth of new writers. The announcement was coupled with opinion articles from several of CoC's current and former writers.Chronicles of Chaos'' remains online as an archive, containing over 7,500 reviews, interviews and opinion articles that were published during a span of twenty years.

References

External links
Chronicles of Chaos

1995 establishments in Canada
2015 disestablishments in Canada
Defunct magazines published in Canada
Heavy metal publications
Magazines established in 1995
Magazines disestablished in 2015
Online music magazines published in Canada